Adriaen van der Spelt (c. 1630 in Leiden – 1673 in Gouda), was a Dutch Golden Age flower painter.

Biography
According to Houbraken, whose comments were based on the Gouda stories by Ignatius Walvis, he was an excellent flower painter born in Leiden, but his parentage was from Gouda. He spent many years at the court of Brandenburg working for Frederick William I, Elector of Brandenburg, but moved to Gouda to marry a third time with a nasty wife from Groningen who drove him to his grave.

According to the RKD he was a flower painter who spent the years 1664-1670 at the court of Brandenburg.

References

 Walvis, Ignatius in: Beschryving der stad Gouda, 1713, Gouda; facsimile edition 1972, 

1630 births
1673 deaths
Dutch Golden Age painters
Dutch male painters
Artists from Leiden
People from Gouda, South Holland
Court painters
Flower artists